Agabus ambiguus is a species of predacious diving beetle belonging to the family Dytiscidae. This species occurs across the United States and Canada. It has been collected from depositional areas of springs, streams, and stream-fed ponds. Adults can be active in open water throughout winter.

References

Beetles of North America
Beetles described in 1823
Agabus (beetle)